Daniel Hernández Trejo (born 16 February 1994) is a Mexican professional footballer who currently plays for Loros UdeC.

Honours
Mexico U17
FIFA U-17 World Cup: 2011

Mexico U20
Central American and Caribbean Games: 2014

References

External links
 
 

Living people
1994 births
Mexican footballers
Association football midfielders
Atlas F.C. footballers
Atlante F.C. footballers
Dorados de Sinaloa footballers
Potros UAEM footballers
Loros UdeC footballers
Liga MX players
Ascenso MX players
Liga Premier de México players
Tercera División de México players
Footballers from Querétaro
Mexico youth international footballers
People from San Juan del Río